HitClips is a digital audio player created by Tiger Electronics that plays low-fidelity mono one-minute clips of usually teen pop hits from exchangeable cartridges. It first launched in August 2000 with 60-second microchip songs featuring Britney Spears, NSYNC, and Sugar Ray. The following year songs by Destiny's Child, Backstreet Boys, Dream, and Pink were additionally released. There is a version for young children called KidClips.  Tiger Electronics had licensing agreements for HitClips with popular major record labels including Atlantic Records, Jive Records/Zomba Label Group, and Capitol Records. HitClips was first promoted by McDonald's, Radio Disney, and Lunchables. By June 2002, HitClips players and music disks combined had sold more than 20 million units.

Hilary Duff became the spokesperson for HitClips in 2003. In 2004, she was succeeded by Raven-Symoné when the format was changed into a 2-minute mini circular cartridge. At that point 30 million units had been sold.

Song list
The songs that were on the HitClips cartridge in 2000–2003 before HitClips disc came along.

HitClips 2000–2002
In June 2002, 80 singles from 30+ artists were available.
3 Doors Down - "Kryptonite"
3 Doors Down - "Be Like That"
The Angels - "My Boyfriend's Back"
Atomic Kitten - ""The Tide Is High"
Atomic Kitten - "Eternal Flame"
Backstreet Boys - "I Want It That Way"
Backstreet Boys - "Shape of My Heart"
Backstreet Boys - "The Call"
Backstreet Boys - "Larger Than Life"
Backstreet Boys - "More than That"
Backstreet Boys - "Show Me the Meaning of Being Lonely"
Backstreet Boys - "Drowning"
Baha Men - "Move It Like This"
Baha Men - "Who Let the Dogs Out?"
Jenifer Bartoli - "Au Soleil"
Daniel Bedingfield - "Gotta Get Thru This"
Blue Swede - "Hooked on a Feeling"
Michelle Branch - "All You Wanted"
Michelle Branch – "Everywhere"
Brandy - "Full Moon"
Vanessa Carlton - "A Thousand Miles"
Vanessa Carlton - "Ordinary Day"
Vanessa Carlton - "White Houses"
Aaron Carter - "Aaron's Party"
Aaron Carter - "Oh Aaron"
Aaron Carter - "Leave It Up to Me"
Aaron Carter - "That's How I Beat Shaq"
Aaron Carter - "I Want Candy"
Aaron Carter - "Not Too Young, Not Too Old"
Nick Carter - "Help Me"
Otis Day and the Knights - "Shout"
Destiny's Child – "Emotion"
Destiny's Child – "Survivor"
Destiny's Child – "Independent Women"
Destiny's Child - "Bootylicious"
Dream - "He Loves U Not"
Dream - "This is Me"
Dream Street - "It Happens Every Time"
Dream Street - "Gotta Get the Girl"
Hilary Duff - "I Can't Wait"
Hilary Duff - "Why Not"
Hilary Duff - "So Yesterday"
Hilary Duff - "Come Clean"
Willa Ford - "Did Ya' Understand That"
Willa Ford - "I Wanna Be Bad"
Gloria Gaynor - "I Will Survive"
Goo Goo Dolls - "Here Is Gone"
Krystal Harris - "Supergirl"
Hanson - "If Only"
Fuel - "Hemorrhage (In My Hands)"
Fuel - "Innocent"
Fuel - "Bad Day"
Hoku - "Another Dumb Blonde"
Hoku - "How Do I Feel"
Enrique Iglesias - "Hero"
Geri Halliwell - "It's Raining Men"
Geri Halliwell - "Scream If You Wanna Go Faster"
Jewel - "Standing Still"
Jump5 - "God Bless the USA"
The Kingsmen - "Louie Louie"
Avril Lavigne - "Complicated"
Avril Lavigne - "Sk8er Boi"
Las Ketchup - "The Ketchup Song (Aserejé)"
Lil Romeo - "The Girlies"
Lil Romeo - "My Baby"
M2M - "Mirror Mirror"
Madonna - "Cherish"
Madonna - "Don't Tell Me"
Madonna - "Lucky Star"
Madonna - "Material Girl"
Madonna - "Music"
Madonna - "Ray of Light"
Madonna - "Nothing Fails"
Nivea & Jagged Edge - "Don't Mess with My Man"
No Secrets - "That's What Girls Do"
No Secrets - "Kids in America"
NSYNC - "Bringin' da Noise"
NSYNC - "Bye Bye Bye"
NSYNC - "Celebrity"
NSYNC - "Girlfriend"
NSYNC - "It's Gonna Be Me"
NSYNC - "No Strings Attached"
NSYNC - "Pop"
NSYNC - "This I Promise You"
Stacie Orrico - "Stuck"
O-Town - "All or Nothing"
O-Town - "Baby I Would"
O-Town - "We Fit Together"
Lindsay Pagano - "Everything U R"
Pink - "Don't Let Me Get Me"
Pink - "There You Go"
Pink - "Most Girls"
Pink - "Get the Party Started"
Play - "Us Against The World"
Paulina Rubio - "Don't Say Goodbye"
S Club 7 - "Natural"
Sammie - "I Like It"
Shaggy - "Angel"
Simple Plan - "Addicted"
Smash Mouth - "All Star"
Smash Mouth - "I'm a Believer"
Smash Mouth - "Pacific Coast Party"
Smash Mouth - "Why Can't We Be Friends"
Will Smith - "Nod Ya Head"
Solange - "Crush"
soulDecision - "Ooh It's Kinda Crazy"
soulDecision - "Let's Do It Right"
soulDecision - "Faded"
Britney Spears - "...Baby One More Time"
Britney Spears - "I'm a Slave 4 U"
Britney Spears - "I'm Not a Girl, Not Yet a Woman"
Britney Spears - "Lucky"
Britney Spears - "Oops!... I Did It Again"
Britney Spears - "Overprotected"
Britney Spears - "Stronger"
Britney Spears - "(You Drive Me) Crazy"
Sugar Ray - "Answer the Phone"
Sugar Ray - "Someday"
Sugar Ray - "When It's Over"
Tiktak - "Upside Down"
Justin Timberlake - "Like I Love You"
Justin Timberlake - "Señorita"
Toya - "I Do!!"
Triple Image and Jamie Lynn Spears - "(Hey Now) Girls Just Want To Have Fun"
Usher - "U Remind Me"
The Jackson 5 - "ABC"

HitClips Disc 2003–2004
Clay Aiken - "Invisible"
Clay Aiken - "The Way"
Avril Lavigne - "Sk8er Boi"
Avril Lavigne - "Complicated"
Atomic Kitten - "The Tide Is High"
Bow Wow and Baby - "Let's Get Down"
Michelle Branch - "Are You Happy Now?"
Michelle Branch - "Breathe"
Kelly Clarkson - "A Moment Like This"
Kelly Clarkson - "Low"
Nikki Cleary - "1-2-3"
Hilary Duff - "Come Clean"
Hilary Duff - "I Can't Wait" 
Hilary Duff - "So Yesterday"
Hilary Duff - "Why Not"
Jewel - "Standing Still"
Lindsay Lohan - "Ultimate"
Lindsay Lohan - "Rumors"
Madonna - "Hollywood"
Raven-Symoné - "Supernatural"
Raven-Symoné - "True to Your Heart"
Stacie Orrico - "(There's Gotta Be) More to Life"
Simple Plan - "Perfect"
Simple Plan - "Addicted"
Smash Mouth - "All Star"
Smash Mouth - "Pacific Coast Party"
Smash Mouth - "I'm a Believer"
Smash Mouth - "You Are My Number One"
Britney Spears and Madonna - "Me Against the Music"

See also
Pocket Rockers
Tooth Tunes

References

External links 

 HitClips: Remembering the most absurd way we listened to music at Mashable

Hasbro brands
Audio storage
Children's entertainment
Audiovisual introductions in 2000
2000s toys
Electronic toys